Same Difference were an English bubblegum pop duo from Portsmouth, England, made up of siblings Sean Smith and Sarah Smith. They came to prominence in 2007 when they finished third in the fourth series of the ITV talent show, The X Factor.

Their music was targeted mostly at children who are 13 and under. Their debut single, "We R One", was released on 24 November 2008, and their debut album, Pop, followed on 1 December 2008.  In November 2009, it was announced that Same Difference had signed a new record deal with PopLife Records, and their second album was released on 7 February 2011.

On 24 December 2014, Same Difference broke the news that they had disbanded but were still considering as to whether to release their third and final album, Superheroes. London Records stated it was fun working with them and that they were disappointed they could not share more musical memories together.

In 2020 Same Difference reunited for a one-off charity single with all proceeds going towards the COVID-19 Urgent Appeal. The single "One Life, One Love" was released through SP Music on 3 August and featured the students of SD Studios.

Biography
The two siblings were brought up in The Dale, Widley, in the Borough of Havant. At the time of their appearance on The X Factor, Sean (born 24 September 1985) was an entertainer in Portsmouth while Sarah (born 4 November 1988) was a student. Sean left home at the age of 17 to perform on cruise ships and appeared in a number of pantomimes.  Together, they performed at a local retirement home. Sarah left home at 16 to attend the Italia Conti Academy of Theatre Arts and completed her diploma in 2007. Sarah has also worked as a model and acted in the show Genie in the House but claims that singing has always been her big passion.

Career
Same Difference did a song and entered the fourth season of the British talent show The X Factor in 2007. They auditioned in London, where judge Simon Cowell described them as "potentially two of the most annoying people I've ever met." However, he went on to champion the duo as mentor, later calling them "genuinely nice people." During the live shows, the siblings came in for particular criticism from judge Louis Walsh, who described them as "cheesy" and suggested that they would be better suited to children's parties and pantomime. In response to Walsh's comments, Cowell and fellow judges Sharon Osbourne and Dannii Minogue all disagreed, praising Same Difference for their upbeat performances.

They were tipped to be the first to be voted out of the competition, but turned out to be a surprise hit of the show, remaining outside the bottom two sing-off places throughout their entire run.

The duo reached the final of the show, largely thanks to their performance of S Club 7's song "Never Had a Dream Come True" which received an enthusiastic reception from the studio audience. They eventually finished in third place; Rhydian Roberts was the runner-up and Leon Jackson was the winner.

Performances on The X Factor

2008: Debut Album
After leaving the show, Same Difference initially signed a one-single contract with Simon Cowell's label Syco. During the X Factor Live tour the pair confirmed that their intended debut single was a cover of "Breaking Free" from High School Musical, which they had performed in the live shows of The X Factor. An original B-side to the single was also planned, entitled "The Miracle". The tracks were recorded in Poland in early March 2008.

In April 2008 it was reported their original one-single deal had been replaced by a better full album deal, still with Syco, rumoured to be worth around £1 million. This was to give them the chance to work with a variety of writers and producers including Mike Stock and Pete Waterman and some of the writers behind Leona Lewis and High School Musical.

On 19 July 2008 they headlined the "My First Festival" show at Legoland Windsor, appearing alongside Chico, Fireman Sam, Angelina Ballerina, Bob the Builder, and The Groovie Movie Band. They also performed many gigs at various places throughout 2008, mainly at Butlins, summer events and festivals and Christmas light switch-ons.

Sarah and Sean made many television appearances after leaving the show, including spots on Blue Peter, Basil's Swap Shop, GMTV and Noel's Christmas Presents. They also made several appearances on Nickelodeon. On 22 November 2008 they returned to The X Factor as special guests and performed their debut single "We R One". On Sunday 14 December 2008 Same Difference appeared as guests on CITV kids' show Toonattik.

Following a deal with Syco, Same Difference-themed dolls were to feature on girls' fashion website Stardoll, joining such notables as Heidi Klum, Avril Lavigne and Britney Spears.

In a newsletter sent to their fans, the duo confirmed that their debut single, "We R One", would be released on the Syco Music/Sony BMG label on 24 November 2008. It was written by J Elofsson and P Westerlund, produced, recorded and mixed by Quiz & Larossi for XL Talent, and published by Universal Music Publishing AB: Elofsongs. It was also confirmed on their official website that their album, released on 1 December 2008, would be called Pop.

One of the new tracks recorded for the album and a potential single is a cover of the Stock Aitken Waterman-penned hit "Turn It Into Love". The song was originally recorded by Kylie Minogue for her first album and was released in Japan where it was Number 1 for 10 weeks. Hazell Dean released it in the UK in 1988, where it reached number 21. Later it was covered in Japanese by the group Wink.

Another of the new tracks recorded for their debut album, "I Need A House", was previously recorded by Swedish popstar Marie Serneholt and released as a single in 2006.

2009–11: The Rest Is History and new record label
Same Difference announced a 21-date UK tour for March and April 2009, but this was subsequently cancelled. Instead, the duo decided to co-headline a 21-date joint tour with fellow X Factor graduate Leon Jackson. Same Difference co-headlined the joint tour at Ipswich and Birmingham. They also played a solo one-off concert in Portsmouth.

Same Difference were dropped by record label Syco following disappointing sales of their debut album. The lack of sales was partially blamed on the demise of Woolworths, a major supplier of music for younger children.

Following their departure from Syco the pair also decided to leave Modest Management, and whilst under the guidance of Jamie Wilson at Heights Management the duo signed a new management deal with Wayne Russell at Do One Music Group. It was under Russell's management that they signed a new album deal with PopLife Records, whilst Wilson negotiated the deal and also co-organized and coordinated a 66-date UK tour of Pontins Holiday Parks. The duo are now represented solely by Heights Management.

In December 2009, Same Difference announced on their Facebook Group the launch of their new-look website, sporting a quirky new look. The first single from their new album, "Shine On Forever (Photo Frame)", was released on 29 August 2010, with music video directed by Lauren Pushkin and produced by PMA Digital.  "Shine On Forever (Photo Frame)" entered the UK Singles Chart at Number 100 on 5 September 2010. The duo released their second album, The Rest Is History, on 7 February 2011.

On 10 September 2011, Same Difference announced on their Facebook and Twitter pages their "Same Difference Pop Academy", a course on singing and dancing for young fans. The course begins in October in Portsmouth.

In late September 2011, Same Difference submitted an entry, "Music", to the Swiss national selection for the Eurovision Song Contest 2012. (Although Eurovision entrants are usually from the country they represent, the rules do not actually require this, and, in particular, Switzerland has previously entered several non-Swiss acts into the competition). The bid failed, along with a separate one from Series 2 UK X Factor contestant Maria Lawson.

2012–2014: Superheroes and split

In spring 2012, Same Difference confirmed they had begun recording their third album, they stated that they had matured and a new sound would feature on their new album. On 6 January 2013 London Records and Same Difference confirmed they had agreed a new record deal.

On 24 December 2014, Same Difference broke the news that they had disbanded but were still considering as to whether to release their third and final album, Superheroes. London Records stated it was fun working with them and that they were disappointed they could not share more musical memories together.

In 2020 Same Difference reunited for a one-off charity single with all proceeds going towards the COVID-19 Urgent Appeal. The single "One Life, One Love" was released through SP Music on 3 August and featured the students of SD Studios.

Sean Smith solo career 
After Same Difference disbanded, Sean Smith performed in the title role of Aladdin in December 2015 at the Stiwt Theatre in Wrexham alongside Alex Reid (fighter).

He then went on to perform in a lead role in the touring UK production of 'That's Entertainment' from 4 April until 8 October 2016, performing alongside artists such as Jane McDonald & The Overtones.

Sean signed to Energise Records as a solo artist, and released his debut solo single "Turn Me On" on 23 September 2016. The single was written by Nalle Ahlstedt and Christian Ingebrigtsen from A1. The remix EP which featured a remix by Paul Varney reached number 15 on the UK iTunes dance album chart. On 17 November 2016, Smith performed the single live for the first time at the Portsmouth Christmas Lights switch on. The single was also performed live at the James Bulger Black Tie & Tiara Ball in Liverpool on 18 March 2017.

He appeared in the title role of Aladdin at the Epstein Theatre in Liverpool from 8 December 2016 to 8 January 2017, starring alongside Natasha Hamilton, Jordan Davies and Mark Byron.

In February 2017, Smith signed a new management deal with SP Music Management.

Sean released his second solo single "Magic" on 26 May 2017. The track reached number 29 on the UK iTunes dance singles chart. On 22 May 2017, he appeared on the ITV show Loose Women to promote "Magic" and unveil his new look.

On 3 June 2017, Sean performed a live set at Oxford Pride which included his single "Turn Me On" and the Andy Sikorski remix of "Magic".

His third solo single "Fire" was released on 2 November 2017. The track reached number 4 on the UK iTunes vocal album chart and number 20 on the UK iTunes vocal singles chart. Smith has recorded a cover version of the track "Verona", originally performed by singers Koit Toome and Laura Põldvere, with Australian singer Peter Wilson. The single was produced by Matt Pop and released on 16 August 2018, entering the iTunes Charts in 12 different countries.

He appeared in Sleeping Beauty playing Prince Charming at the Capitol Theatre, Horsham in December 2018, starring alongside Ben Ofodu. His next single, "Do or Die" was issued on 28 February 2019. The single reached number 3 on the UK iTunes Vocal Singles Chart.

Sean played Tin Man in The Wizard Of Oz at The Epstein in Liverpool from 11 to 27 April 2019.

Sean was the lead vocalist on the 'Beware The Bear' track "Show Me Love", which was featured on the BBC2 drama Mother Father Son starring Richard Gere. The single was released on 23 May 2019 through SP Music.

He toured in Puttin' On The Ritz in Australia and the UK in mid 2019. Smith released "Dirty Mirrors", a duet with singer Ben Davidson, through Energise Records on 4 November 2019. In December 2019, Smith played Aladdin at The forum Theatre in Barrow. This production then moved to the Colne Muni theatre in January 2020.

Sean released his debut solo album "Solo" through Energise Records on 20 July 2020.

Sean featured on the Beware The Bear track "Wishing on the Water" which was released through SP Music on 27 August 2020. The track peaked at number #11 on the UK iTunes Vocal Chart & number #2 on the French iTunes Vocal Chart.

Sean then featured on the 5 track Beware The Bear EP "We Will Survive" released through SP Music on 11 November 2020. The EP peaked at number #15 on the UK iTunes Singer Songwriter Album Chart.

Sean released the "Hazard/Human" EP through Energise Records on 22 March 2021.

Sean will release his new album "Swing For The 90's" through SP Music on 16 April 2021. "You're All That Matters To Me" was released as an instant grat on 14 March and peaked at number #2 on the UK iTunes Jazz Singles Chart. On 29 March 'Sweetness' was released on iTunes as an instant grat. The single peaked at number #1 on the UK iTunes Jazz Singles Chart. Sean released "End of the Line" as an instant grat on 5 April. The single peaked at number #2 on the UK iTunes Jazz Singles Chart.'Who Do You Think You Are' was the final instant grat released on 12 April. Sean's version hit number #1 on the UK iTunes Jazz Singles Chart. The album hit number #1 on the UK iTunes Jazz Album Chart & number #30 on the overall UK iTunes Album Chart. 

Sean released the duet "One And One" with Peter Wilson through Energise Records on 23 April 2021.

Sean released the single 'In Love With The Night' through SP Music on the 17th June 2022. The single peaked at number 49 on the UK iTunes Dance Chart.

Sean's new single "Young Love will be released on the 13th February 2023.

Television appearances

Same Difference were invited again to The X Factor in 2008 to perform their debut single, "We R One". In 2009, they received a minor acting role in CBBC television sitcom Dani's House, in which they played brother and sister "Erik and Erika", two all-time winners of game shows. In 2009, Same Difference appeared in The DPK Gameshow (Danny, Pearse and Kevin). They also appeared on Celebrity Juice in 2013. In September 2016, Same Difference were interviewed on This Morning.

Other appearances
Same Difference switched on the Christmas lights in 2009 in the town of Coalville, Leicestershire. They switched on the Christmas lights in Burton upon Trent in November 2010.

They also played Lilac Fairy and Prince Robin at Weston-super-Mare, in the pantomime Sleeping Beauty December to January 2012 – 2013.

Same Difference performed at The Concorde Club in Eastleigh on 26 November 2016.

Discography

Studio albums

Singles

References

External links

English pop music duos
Musical groups established in 2007
Musical groups disestablished in 2014
Sibling musical duos
People from the Borough of Havant
The X Factor (British TV series) contestants
Musicians from Portsmouth
Musical groups from Hampshire